Tarzan (also known as Tarzan 3D) is a 2013 German computer-animated action-adventure film written, directed and produced by German producer Reinhard Klooss which was released on October 17, 2013 in Russia. The film was released across early 2014 in other countries. The film stars the voices of Kellan Lutz, Spencer Locke, Anton Zetterholm, Mark Deklin, Joe Cappelletti, and Jaime Ray Newman. The screenplay was written by Reinhard Klooss, Jessica Postigo and Yoni Brenner. The film is based on the classic book Tarzan of the Apes (1912) by Edgar Rice Burroughs, and is one of many adaptations. The film grossed $44 million worldwide despite receiving predominantly negative reviews from critics. Tarzan was released on DVD and Blu-ray on August 5, 2014 by Highlight Film.

Plot

65,000,000 years ago, a mountain-sized asteroid crashed into the Earth in what is now the Yucatán Peninsula in Mexico, with a major chunk of the asteroid landing in Uganda. The impact and resulting ecological catastrophe is known as the Cretaceous–Paleogene extinction event. In the present day, wealthy industrialist John Greystoke has been funding an expedition into the jungles of East Africa to locate the meteor, now a legend, and harness its unique energy. Despite the best efforts by scientist and adventurer James Porter, the expedition is a failure, and John is preparing to leave Africa with his wife, Alice, and their son, John Jr.

Not far away, a rogue gorilla, Tublat, comes across a troop of his fellow gorillas, led by a silverback male named Kerchak. In a fight for dominance, Kerchak defeats the rogue and begins to return to his mate, Kala, and their newborn child, only for Tublat to deal him a fatal blow. Kala and the others can only look on in horror.

On a course that takes them over a semi-active volcano, the Greystokes' helicopter's instruments begin to go haywire. As the pilot struggles to regain control, they find themselves over the resting site of the meteor. Landing to investigate, John explores a cave that leads him into the heart of the mountain, where he discovers rock formations that glow with a pulsing red light. Using his pickaxe, John attempts to collect a sample for study, only to cause a chain reaction that awakens the nearby volcano. Despite their best efforts to escape, the helicopter crashes, and only John Jr. survives. The boy is discovered by Kala, who has recently lost her child to Tublat's regime. She takes him back to her nest. Johnny is adopted into the troop and discards his former identity, choosing to be called "Tarzan", a name he made up meaning "Ape with no fur."

As time passes, Tarzan grows up learning the ways of the jungle animals. One day, after venturing further than his friends are willing to go, Tarzan catches sight of a group of humans in a jeep. In the years since the Greystokes' disappearance, Dr. James Porter has continued to fund his expeditions by acting as a jungle guide for wealthy tourists. On this particular trip, he is joined by his daughter Jane Porter.
During a routine photographic safari, one of the Porters' latest clients wanders away from the group, unwittingly attracting the attention of a large, dinosaur-like flightless bird. Jane saves him by luring the bird toward her but it begins chasing her, along with some of its friends. Jane manages to escape with Tarzan's help, only to be bitten on the arm by a viper. Tarzan, infatuated with the young woman, carries her to a shelter, caring for and watching over her all night. The next day, Jane stumbles back into her father's camp with only vague memories of the night before. Jane chalks most of her rescue up to a bad dream. Still, as she and her father drive away, Jane whispers a good-bye to her rescuer and leaves one of her bandages behind. Tarzan picks it up and carries it back home.

Confused and frustrated by exposure to humans after so long, Tarzan ignores the company of Kala and his gorilla friends and leaves the troop's territory. Eventually he wanders to the site of the helicopter crash, where long-forgotten memories come flooding back to him. Tarzan finds a meteor stone which his father had taken as a sample. Tarzan builds a shelter   around the crash and makes it his retreat, gathering anything interesting he can find it from the wreck, including his father's hunting knife. Years later, Tarzan, now a man, returns to his retreat to find Tublat nosing around. Tarzan chases the silverback away. Unbeknownst to Tarzan, during his rummaging, Tublat activated the helicopter's emergency beacon. The transmission is received by Greystoke Energies. William Clayton, CEO of the company since John and Alice's disappearance, knowing what his former employer was looking for, sees only a chance to make money. When the office is visited by Jane Porter, who now works for a conservation group, Clayton manipulates her, promising to fund her group if she will accompany him and his assistant to Africa to speak with her father.

Only in Africa is Clayton's true nature is revealed. Disgusted by his callousness, Jane leaves the party and wanders into the jungle where Tarzan immediately finds her. Astounded by seeing her rescuer after so long, Jane travels with Tarzan, who brings her to his refuge. Tarzan, as a mark of love, chips off a piece of the meteor rock and gives it to Jane, who realizes the meteor's significance. When the rest of the group tracks Jane down to Tarzan's hideaway, Clayton is shocked to find the Greystoke heir alive, and thus a threat to his power. Clayton opens fire on Tarzan and Jane, casing them to flee. Tarzan and Jane are forced to enter a mysterious valley, which has come under the effects of the meteor's unique energies, causing bizarre mutations in the local flora and fauna. Ordinary jungle plants become dangerous predatory monsters. After defeating one of these beasts to save Jane, Tarzan and Jane find their way into the heart of the meteor itself. Here, Tarzan discovers his father's long abandoned pickaxe, and utters a single word, "Greystoke". Jane realizes Tarzan's true identity as John and Alice Greystoke's son. She asks how Tarzan has survived alone in the jungle for so long, to which the wild man replies that his family took care of him.

Meanwhile, Kala continues to worry over her son. One of Tarzan's friends alerts her to Tarzan's homecoming and the fact he has apparently taken a mate during his time away. Tarzan introduces Jane to Kala, who is overjoyed at her son's choice in a female. The happy reunion is cut short by Tublat, who is enraged at Tarzan's return. Tarzan challenges him for the right to lead, and willingly forgoes his knife. At first, Tublat dominates the fight, but Tarzan brings Tublat down. Tarzan spares Tublat's life but exiles him from the troop. His long-time enemy defeated, Tarzan ascends to the high rocks overlooking the nesting grounds and beats his chest, letting out a loud, long cry of victory (the famous ape man cry). That night, under the stars, Jane and Tarzan admit to their love.

Jane and Tarzan discover that Dr. James Porter's base camp has been transformed into a virtual armed base by an army of mercenaries Clayton has brought. Jane realizes that her father will not stop unless he finds her, endangering Tarzan and the gorilla family's entire home. She decides to head back. Clayton sees Jane returning to the camp and notices the meteor Tarzan gave her. Tarzan watches the events unfold from a distance and shows up, when Clayton and his men hold Jane at gunpoint. Kala, who followed Jane and Tarzan, runs in to protect them, and gets shot by Clayton, falling unconscious. Tarzan is attacked from behind and locked in a cage. Luckily, Tarzan's gorilla friends locate him and free him. Tarzan moves Kala into the jungle, where he treats her wound. Tarzan, now determined to put an end to Clayton's discovery, reaches the mountain where the meteor is hidden. Clayton, meanwhile has moved all his resources up the mountain and has rigged the place with explosives, not realizing that the resulting chain reaction could cause another mass extinction. Jane and Dr. James Porter are tied up and left to die. Tarzan rescues Jane and her father, who decides to stay behind and cut the wires leading from the detonator to the explosives. As Jane and Tarzan exit the cave, Clayton holds them at gunpoint. Tarzan summons his jungle friends with a loud cry. In the ensuing battle, the meteor awakens the nearby volcano and the mountain begins to give way. Jane and Tarzan escape, but Clayton and his crew aren’t as fortunate. Jane and Tarzan return to the nesting ground and reunite with the family, relieved to see that Kala is safe. Tarzan and Jane then vow before the troop to protect their jungle home. At the end Dr. James Porter is seen climbing up a cliff with a piece of the meteor, now in better hands than it would have been if it ended up in Clayton's.

Cast
 Kellan Lutz as John Greystoke Jr. / Tarzan, a man who was raised by apes from childhood following his survival of the helicopter crash that killed his parents.
 Craig Garner and Jonathan Morgan Heit as 4-year-old Tarzan
 Anton Zetterholm as a teenage Tarzan
 Spencer Locke as Jane Porter, the daughter of Dr. Porter and Tarzan's love interest.
 Jaime Ray Newman as Alice Greystoke, Tarzan's late mother who died in a helicopter crash along with her husband.
 Robert Capron as Derek
 Mark Deklin as John Greystoke, the late father of Tarzan and former CEO of Greystoke Energies. Before his death, John was exploring the site of an ancient meteorite crash, and was on the brink of a discovery.
 Trevor St. John as William Clayton, the greedy and scheming CEO of Greystoke Energies who sends a mercenary army to eliminate Tarzan and Jane.
 Brian Huskey as Smith
 Faton Millanaj as Miles
 Maximilian Nepomuk Allgeier as Pilot 2
 Christian Serritiello as Chris
 Brian Bloom as Miller
 Andy Wareham as Tublat, the rogue gorilla who takes over Kurchak's troop. 
 Jeff Burrell as Derek's Father
 Jason Hildebrandt as the narrator
 Joe Cappelletti as Professor James Porter, Jane's father and an old friend of Tarzan's parents.

Production
Development on the film was announced in August 2010 when Constantin acquired animation rights to the “Tarzan” novels from the estate of author Edgar Rice Burroughs. The film's motion capture was shot in the Bavaria Film studio in Munich, and the animation process was worked on in two studios, one in Bavaria and the other in Hannover.

Release
The film was reportedly set to premiere in Germany on October 17, 2013. although its release date was revised and set for February 20, 2014 after its release in several other countries.

On 24 April 2014, the Dublin premiere of the film was in aid of conservation charity Ape Action Africa, supported by the lead, Kellan Lutz, who is himself interested in conservation.

Home media
Tarzan was released on DVD and Blu-ray on August 5, 2014 by Highlight Film.

Reception

Critical response
Tarzan was not screened in advance for critics, and received predominantly negative reviews, who panned the film's storyline and animation. , the film holds a 20% approval rating on review aggregator Rotten Tomatoes, based on 30 reviews with an average rating 4.54 out of 10. Peter Debruge of Variety called it "an eyesore for anyone above the age of 10 — literally, for those opting to see it in badly miscalibrated 3D". Jordan Mintzer of The Hollywood Reporter said, "All of this feels awfully simplistic, like a 10-minute cartoon sketch bloated into a full-length movie, and one that's backed by an over-explanatory voiceover that can sometimes sound awkward." Reagan Gavin Rasquinha of The Times of India rated it 2 out of 5 stars, calling it "a slipshod rendering of a classic." Angie Errigo of Empire rated it 2 out of 5, saying, "Ponderously plotted and unwonderfully animated, this will disappoint audiences spoilt by Pixar-grade animations." Peter Bradshaw of The Guardian said, "Here's a muddled and dull new family film about Tarzan, who in keeping with tradition is as clean-shaven and all-over hairless as any male stripper." Neil Smith of Total Film said, "Phil Collins songs aside, the last animated Tarzan marked the final flourish of the Disney Renaissance and coined a whopping $448M worldwide. This computer-generated mo-cap version can’t help to compete, even without a club-footed updating that turns Edgar Rice Burrough’s loinclothed apeman into a tree-hugger defending his jungle against capitalists." and added "Having trashed one icon in The Legend Of Hercules, Kellan Lutz shafts another with vocals admittedly well-suited to the muscle-bound mannequin. What really sabotages Reinhard Klooss’ film, though, is a subplot involving a meteorite-derived power source."

Awards
Golden Trailer Awards 2014
 Golden Trailer - Best Foreign Animation/Family Trailer - Constantin Film Produktion The Refinery For the second trailer - theatrical trailer. - Nominated
International Film Music Critics Award (IFMCA) 2014
 IFMCA Award - Best Original Score for an Animated Feature Film - David Newman - Nominated

Soundtrack

References

External links
 

2013 3D films
2013 films
2013 computer-animated films
2013 fantasy films
Animated films about orphans
Films directed by Reinhard Klooss
German 3D films
German animated films
Films using motion capture
Tarzan films
English-language German films
Films scored by David Newman
German action adventure films
Films set in Africa
Animated films about gorillas
Films set in New York City
Films shot in New York City
Films about animals
Films shot in Uganda
Summit Entertainment films
Lionsgate films
Summit Entertainment animated films
Lionsgate animated films
3D animated films
2010s English-language films
2010s American films
2010s German films